Bedivere ( or ; ; ; , also Bedevere and other spellings) is one of the earliest characters to be featured in the legend of King Arthur, originally described in several Welsh texts as the one-handed great warrior named Bedwyr Bedrydant. Arthurian chivalric romances, inspired by his portrayal in the chronicle Historia Regum Britanniae,  portray Bedivere as a Knight of the Round Table of King Arthur who serves as Arthur's marshal and is frequently associated with his brother Lucan and his cousin Griflet as well as with Kay. In the English versions, Bedivere notably assumes Griflet's hitherto traditional role from French romances as the one who eventually returns Excalibur to the Lady of the Lake after Arthur's last battle.

Bedwyr 
In early Welsh sources, Bedwyr Bedrydant ("Bedwyr of the Perfect Sinew") is a handsome, one-handed warrior under Arthur's command. His father is given as Pedrawd or Bedrawd, and his children as Amhren and Eneuawg, both members of Arthur's court.

One of the earliest direct references to Bedwyr can be found in the 10th-century poem Pa gur which recounts the exploits of a number of Arthur's men, including Bedwyr, Cei (Kay) and Manawydan. Of Bedwyr, this narrative says:

The 9th-century version of Englynion y Beddau ("The Stanzas of the Graves") gives Bedwyr's final resting place on Tryfan. In the hagiography of Cadoc, Bedwyr is alongside Arthur and Cei in dealing with King Gwynllyw of Gwynllwg's abduction of Gwladys from her father's court in Brycheiniog. A possible allusion to Bedwyr could be found in the reference to Bedwyr's well in the 9th-century Marwnad Cadwallon ap Cadfan. The Welsh Triads name Bedwyr as "Battle-Diademed", and a superior to Drystan (Tristan), Hueil mab Caw and even Cei. A catchphrase often quipped by Cei, "by the hand of my friend" is likely a reference to Bedwyr's disability.

Bedwyr is a prominent character in the tale of Culhwch and Olwen, in which he appears at the head of Arthur's court list with his friend Cei and is described as one of the most handsome men in the world (save for Arthur and Drych fab Cibddar), and the wielder of a magic lance. He is called upon to accompany Culhwch on his quest to win Olwen's hand in marriage and is the first to strike the giant Ysbaddaden with the poisoned spear meant for Culhwch. Bedwyr goes on to assist Culhwch in completing the impossible tasks given to him by Ysbaddaden; he helps Cei and Goreu fab Custennin kill Wrnach the Giant, rescues Mabon ap Modron from his imprisonment, retrieves the hairs of Dillus the Bearded, captures the Cauldron of Diwrnach during Arthur's raid on Ireland, and takes part in the hunting of the monstrous boar Twrch Trwyth with Arthur's dog Cavall at his side. The tale ends with the completion of the tasks, the humiliation and death of Ysbaddaden, and the marriage of Culhwch and Olwen.

Bedivere 
Bedivere is one of Arthur's loyal allies in Geoffrey of Monmouth's Historia Regum Britanniae and maintains this position in much later Arthurian literature. He helps Arthur and Kay fight the Giant of Mont Saint-Michel, and joins Arthur in his war against Emperor Lucius of Rome, in which he dies fighting. In Thomas Malory's Le Morte d'Arthur, 'Bedwyr' (as he is initially known) plays a similar role against the Giant, before disappearing from the text to return rather ingloriously as Sir Bedivere to accompany Arthur at his end. In the original French romances, the later role belonged to his cousin, Griflet.

In several English versions of Arthur's death, including Malory's, the Alliterative Morte Arthure and the Stanzaic Morte Arthur, Bedivere and Arthur are among the few survivors of the Battle of Camlann (or of Salisbury). After the battle, at the request of the mortally wounded king, Bedivere casts away the sword Excalibur that Arthur had received from the Lady of the Lake. However, he does this only after twice thinking the sword too valuable to Britain to throw into the water. When he reports that nothing in particular happened, King Arthur admonishes him, for Arthur knows that the mystical sword would create some supernatural event. Finally, Bedivere casts the sword into the water, at which a hand arises and catches the sword mid-air, then sinks into the waters, and Arthur is thus assured that the sword has been returned. In Malory's telling, this act summons Morgan and Nimue, who take the king to Avalon. Upon the presumed death of Arthur, Bedivere enters a hermitage led by the Mordred-ousted Archbishop of Canterbury, where he spends the remainder of his life. There he will be joined by Lancelot and some of his kindred knights, who will resort to it in their own penitence.

Modern fiction
Some modern authors such as Rosemary Sutcliff (Sword at Sunset), Gillian Bradshaw (Hawk of May), and Mary Stewart (The Merlin Trilogy) give him Lancelot's traditional role as Guinevere's lover, Lancelot having been added to the cycle too late to seem historical. 

In the 1975 comedy film Monty Python and the Holy Grail, the ironically-named Sir Bedevere the Wise (played by Terry Jones) is regarded as brilliant at science by other characters, but his methods revolve around absurd theories such as the Earth being banana-shaped and witches burning and floating on water because they are made of wood. He devises a Trojan Horse styled scheme with a big wooden rabbit to get inside a French fortress, but overlooks the crucial detail of Arthur and the knights actually being inside it.
In John Boorman's 1981 film Excalibur, Percival replaces Bedivere as the knight that returns the sword to the Lady of the Lake.
Bedivere is the main character in the 1994 novel Grailblazers by Tom Holt.
Although he plays a minor part in Bernard Cornwell's The Warlord Chronicles, many of his legendary deeds (such as throwing Excalibur into the lake; or in Cornwell's story, the sea) are carried out instead by the protagonist, Derfel Cadarn. Derfel too loses one of his hands and then fights one-armed during the final act of Excalibur: A Novel of Arthur (1997).
He appears in Philip Reeve's 2007 Here Lies Arthur as Bedwyr and befriends the main character Gwyn. He is Arthur's half-sister's younger son, the older being Medrawt (Mordred). He is murdered by Arthur, for betrayal with Arthur's wife, Gwenhwyfar (Guinevere), in a similar role to the later Lancelot. This causes a family rift with Medrawt, who takes revenge by raising an army and attacking Arthur, killing him, and taking the city of Aquae Sulis (ruled by Arthur) for himself.
Sir Bedivere has a cameo in the 2008 BBC series Merlin in the episode "Le Morte d'Arthur", in which he is killed by the Questing Beast.
Bedivere appears in the video game and visual novel Fate/stay night in an epilogue, during the game's version of Artoria's death. He also appears in the mobile game Fate/Grand Order as a character summonable by the protagonist, notably from a version of the Arthurian tale where he fails in delivering Excalibur to the Lady of the Lake, inadvertently stopping King Arthur from going to Avalon. In the anime adaptation by Studio Deen, the character is female (voiced by Mamiko Noto).
Bedivere appears as the final boss of the Avalonian Dungeon in the MMORPG Albion Online as "Lord Bedivere".

References

External links

Bedivere at The Camelot Project

Arthurian characters
Celtic mythology
Fictional hermits
Knights of the Round Table